TFIIA-alpha and beta-like factor is a protein that in humans is encoded by the GTF2A1L gene.

The assembly and stability of the RNA polymerase II transcription pre-initiation complex on a eukaryotic core promoter involve the effects of TFIIA on the interaction between TATA-binding protein (TBP) and DNA. 

This gene encodes a germ cell-specific counterpart of the large (alpha/beta) subunit of general transcription factor TFIIA that is able to stabilize the binding of TBP to DNA and may be uniquely important to testis biology. Alternative splicing for this locus has been observed and two variants, encoding distinct isoforms, have been identified. 

Co-transcription of this gene and the neighboring upstream gene generates a rare transcript (SALF), which encodes a fusion protein consisting of sequence sharing identity with each individual gene product.

References

Further reading